Oil and Gas Development Company Limited, commonly known as OGDCL  is a Pakistani oil and gas company. It has a primary listing on the Pakistan Stock Exchange, and secondary listing on the London Stock Exchange. Established in 1961 by the Government of Pakistan, it was turned into a public listed company on 23 October 1997. Today it is involved in exploring, drilling, refining and selling oil and gas in Pakistan. It is based on Jinnah Avenue, Blue Area in Islamabad, with the Government of Pakistan holding 74% stake in the company. Rest are held by private investors. For the financial year 2022, it reported net sales of  Rs 335.46 billion and profit of Rs 133.78 billion.

It is the largest company in Pakistan in terms of market capitalisation, and has repeatedly ranked among the Forbes Global 2000.

Listing
On 4 May 2009, the government of Pakistan appointed a Citigroup-led consortium to advise the state-run Privatisation Commission on the sale of 10 to 15 per cent (or 430 to 645 million shares) of the company. OGDCL is the second Pakistani company to have been listed at the London Stock Exchange. The company was also listed in Pakistan at all the three exchanges of the country namely Karachi Stock Exchange (KSE), Lahore Stock Exchange (LSE) and Islamabad Stock Exchange (ISE).

Discoveries and exploration
During the fiscal year ended 30 June 2006 the company made several oil and gas discoveries, including at Nim-1, Dars Deep-1, Tando Allah Yar North-1, Kunnar Deep-1 and Bahu-1.   OGDCL's daily production, including share from joint ventures averaged  of oil;  of gas, and 358 metric tons of liquefied petroleum gas. The Company holds exploration acreage comprising 40 exploration licenses covering an area of 75,905 square kilometres, including 16 exploration licenses covering an area of 28,066 square kilometres granted to OGDCL during fiscal 2006. During 2009–2010, the company acquired four new exploration blocks (Channi Pull, Jandran west, Lakhi Rud and Mari east), covering area of around 4,795 Square kilometres. Three exploration licenses namely Khiranwala, Thatta and Thatta east were surrendered and operatorship of offshore Indus-S was transferred to BP Alpha.

Educational institutes 
The OGDCL Institute of Science & Technology was established in 1979 in Islamabad. In 1986, the OIST (formerly OGTI) relocated to the I-9 sector of Islamabad. The OIST has played an important role in field training. 

In March 2013, the OGTI under the name OGDCL Institute of Science and Technology was allowed to award degrees.

Highlights
Financial 2014
 The company's sales revenue increased by 15.06% to PKR 257.01 billion (2012–13: PKR 223.37 billion)
 Net realised prices of crude oil and gas averaged US$87.71/barrel and PKR 282.95/Mcf respectively (2012–13: US$83.40/barrel and PKR 265.87/Mcf)
 Profit of the company before taxation rose by 17.4% to PKR 172.35 billion (2012–13: PKR 146.81 billion)
 After tax profit of the company rose by 35.76% to PKR 123.91 billion (2012–13: PKR 91.27 billion)
 Earnings per share increased to PKR 28.81 (2012–13: PKR 21.22)
 The company declared dividend of PKR 9.25 per share (2012–13: PKR 8.25 per share)
 Total assets of the company increased to PKR 496.23 billion from PKR 413.93 billion
 The company contributed PKR 132.26 billion to national exchequer (2008–09: PKR 129.62 billion).

Operational
 The company made six oil, gas/condensate discoveries namely Reti-1A, Baloch-1, Dakhni-11, Maru-1, Nashpa-1 and Shah-1
 The company commenced production from Baloch-1 Nashpa-1, and Pakhro-1
 LPG product on working interest basis averaged 202 metric tons per day
 During the year, the company acquired 2493 L. km of 2-D seismic data in Bagh South, Bitrism, Dhakni, Guddu, Mari East, Mianwali, Nashpa, Nim, Thando Allah Yar, Thano Beg and Thal concessions, 290 km2 of 3-D seismic data in Soghri concession and Toot Mining Lease by running five seismic crews having latest technologies and equipped with quality control software for on-site data processing during the surveys
 Forty well locations were marked on ground and twenty six wells including thirteen exploratory, two appraisal and eleven development were spudded by the company.

Non-operated joint ventures
 Adhi field; OGDCL has 50% stake and Pakistan Petroleum Limited (PPL) is the operator of the field
 Badar field; OGDCL has 50% working interest and PEL (Pakistan Exploration private Limited) is the operator
 Badin-II, Badin-II revised and Badin-III fields; OGDCL has 49%, 24% and 15% stake respectively. BP Pakistan (British Petroleum Pakistan) is the operator
 Badhra, Bhit and Kadanwari fields; OGDCL has 20%, 20% and 50% working interest respectively and ENI (Eni Pakistan Limited) is the operator
 Bangali, Dhurnal and Ratana fields; OGDCL working interest is 50%, 20% and 25% respectively and M/s OPII is the operator
 Miano field; OGDCL has 52% stake and OMV (OMV Pakistan Exploration GmbH) is the operator of the field. During 2009–10, three wells were put on production
 Pindori field; OGDCL holds 50% working interest and POL (Pakistan Oilfields Limited) is the operator
 Sara and Suri fields; OGDCL has 40% stake in the fields and Tullow Pakistan is operating these fields
 TAL Block; OGDCL working interest is 27.76% and MOL Pakistan (MOL Pakistan Oil and Gas BV) is the operator.

Reserves

See also 
List of largest companies in Pakistan

References

External links

 Oil and Gas Development Company Limited
 Forbes report on OGDC privatization
 OGDCL Pakistan starts trading at London Stock Exchange

Oil and gas companies of Pakistan
Natural gas pipelines in Pakistan
Government-owned companies of Pakistan
Companies based in Islamabad
Energy companies established in 1961
Non-renewable resource companies established in 1961
Pakistani companies established in 1961
Companies listed on the London Stock Exchange
Companies listed on the Pakistan Stock Exchange